Cymbium tritonis is a species of sea snail, a marine gastropod mollusk in the family Volutidae, the volutes.

Description

Distribution
This marine species is found in the European waters of the North Atlantic Ocean. and off Morocco.

References

 Pallary P. (1930). Révision du genre Yetus. Annales du Musée d'Histoire Naturelle de Marseille 22(3): 54-77, pl. 1-2
 Bruynseels J.K. (1975). Genus Cymbium Röding, 1798. Gloria Maris, Antwerpen 36 pp., 12 pl.: page(s): 14-18; pl. 5
 Bail, P.; Poppe, G.T. (2001). A conchological iconography: a taxonomic introduction of the recent Volutidae. ConchBooks, Hackenheim. 30 pp, 5 pl.

External links
 Broderip, W. J. (1830). A monograph of the genus Cymba. In: G. B. Sowerby I (ed.) Species Conchyliorum, or concise original descriptions and observations accompanied by figures of all the species of recent shells, with their varieties. G.B. Sowerby, London. 7 pp., 7 pls.
 MNHN, Paris: syntype

Volutidae
Gastropods described in 1830